The Aïr and Ténéré Addax Sanctuary is a nature reserve in the north center of the nation of Niger. The reserve forms part of the larger Aïr and Ténéré National Nature Reserve, which is a UNESCO World Heritage Site.

The Sanctuary exists to protect the critically endangered Addax, which once roamed much of the Aïr Mountains and Ténéré desert. Established 1 January 1988, the sanctuary IUCN type Ia Strict Nature Reserve, the most restricted faunal reserve in Niger.

Plans in the early 1990s to reintroduce captive bred Addax into the sanctuary were derailed by the advent of the 1990s Tuareg insurgency, while reimplementation has been stopped by fighting which erupted in 2007. As of 2006, it was feared that whatever Addax population remained in the sanctuary was no longer self-sustaining.

See also
Addax nasomaculatus
Aïr and Ténéré National Nature Reserve

References

Rod East, David P. Mallon, Steven Charles Kingswood. Antelopes: Global Survey and Regional Action Plans. International Union for Conservation of Nature and Natural Resources. IUCN (1988)   pp. 14–21, 168
unep-wcmc site record
World Database on Protected Areas / UNEP-World Conservation Monitoring Centre (UNEP-WCMC), 2008.
Biodiversity and Protected Areas-- Niger, Earth Trends country profile (2003)

National parks of Niger
Protected areas established in 1988
1988 establishments in Niger